Omorgus ovalis is a species of hide beetle in the subfamily Omorginae.

References

ovalis
Beetles described in 1957